What Becomes of the Broken Hearted? is a 1996 novel by Alan Duff. It is the sequel to Duff's novel Once Were Warriors (1990),  which was made into a film in 1994.

Jake begins the book alone after the first book except for a younger street kid who helped him at his lowest point at the end of the previous book. Estranged from his family, Jake and slowly, accidentally becomes more responsible and mature. Jake befriends a large family group of rugby-playing, pig-hunting Māori, contrasting with his son's entry into a gang of welfare pooling petty criminals.

The novel was adapted as the movie What Becomes of the Broken Hearted? in 1999.

What Becomes of the Broken Hearted? was followed by the third novel in the Once Were Warriors trilogy, Jake's Long Shadow (2002).

References

1996 novels
20th-century New Zealand novels
New Zealand novels adapted into films
Sequel novels
Novels by Alan Duff
Works about Māori people